Gymnastics events have been staged at the Olympic Games since 1896, with women competing for the time at the 1928 Olympic Games. Switzerland has sent full teams of women artistic gymnasts to the 1972 and 1984 Olympic Games. Three-time Olympian Giulia Steingruber has represented Switzerland at the Olympics more than any other Swiss female gymnast.

Gymnasts

Medalists

References

Switzerland
gymnasts
Olympic